Conan Exiles is a survival video game developed and published by Funcom for PlayStation 4, Windows, and Xbox One. The game is set in the world of Conan the Barbarian, with the custom playable character being rescued by Conan, beginning their journey. Early access versions of the game were released in early 2017, leaving early access on 8 May 2018. An enhanced version of the game for Xbox Series X and Series S released on 8 June 2021.

Gameplay 
The most basic premise of Conan Exiles is survival in the fictional prehistoric Hyborian Age. Player characters begin convicted of various crimes, sentenced to death, and are crucified under the scorching desert sun. The player character is rescued by Conan and as an exile must navigate the Exiled Lands, a harsh desert landscape. A later update added a biome called the Frozen North, which added elements to build armors, and a land to explore. It also added Star metal which is used to build strong armor, and better tools and weapons. An additional biome, The Highlands, was added in 2017. A high-level Volcano area followed in Q2 2018 in the northernmost region of the game map. This newest addition added Obsidian, used to create powerful tools and weapons rivaling their Star Metal counterparts. Three additional biomes (The Savannah, The Floodlands, and The Ashlands) were added into the game with the release of the Isle of Siptah expansion DLC in Q1 2021. According to Funcom community manager, Jens Erik, the finished game is around 53km2.

Character creation
Conan Exiles features a fair number of customization options such as gender, voice, and several physical attribute sliders for both head and body. Many races may be chosen from including, Cimmerian, Stygian, Hyborian, Nordheimer, and more.  More controversially, sliders for both breast and penis size are also available, the latter being censored in North America by the ESRB.

Religion plays an important role in Conan Exiles. Players may initially swear allegiance to one of seven pantheon gods, Set, Yog, Mitra, Ymir, Derketo, Crom or Zath. All of the religions can later be learned from NPCs in-game, with the exception of Crom, as choosing this is the equivalent of choosing none at all, and is not represented by any in-game benefit. An additional deity, Jhebbal Sag, may be acquired only by speaking with a non-player character (NPC) and completing a certain dungeon. The player may then use any combination of their benefits at any given time, which mainly consists of special crafting recipes. Upon gathering enough offerings specific to each deity, their avatar may also be summoned by the player as a pinnacle form of offense, most commonly against other player bases.

Mechanics
Utilizing natural resources, the player must manage hunger and thirst gauges in addition to warding off hostile enemies, including other players if participating on a PvP server. NPC enemies include savannah and delta fauna such as crocodiles, hyenas, rhinoceroses, and more. Fictional creatures such as dragons, dinosaur-like "shalebacks", and various undead also populate The Exiled Lands. A number of aggressive human NPCs exist in small encampments, villages, and the small city. These human NPCs may be captured using Conan Exiles's thrall system. Depending on their profession and rank, captured thralls can provide a number of benefits to the player including faster crafting speeds, reduced material costs, exclusive crafting recipes, and melee or ranged defense. As of a 2018 update, pets were added to the game, allowing animals to be captured in the wild in the form of baby animals or eggs, and raised as travel companions or player home defense. A mount system was planned for the game, but was not included in the game's release due to console performance limitations. As of 5 December 2019, the mount system has been implemented in an update, which includes both travel and mounted combat.

Progression
Experience points are earned through successful combat, gathering, and crafting, as well as small amounts simply with the passing of time. Though lacking a formal class system, each level-up allows a degree of customization through the selection of attribute points and crafting recipes.

Backstory 
The history of the Exiled Lands is revealed to the player by Warmaker Klael, one of the Giantkings, the ancient rulers of the Exiled Lands. Klael reveals that the humans once came to the giantkings as refugees, and the giantkings offered the humans the frozen wastelands of the North to settle. The humans built a city among the trees and practiced weird sciences and worshiped demon gods. There was peace and trade for a thousand years between the humans and giantkings. However, due to human greed, war eventually broke out. When the war began, the giantkings created the bracelet, adorned by all players to bend the will of the human prisoners of war, allow them to understand the language of giantkings, and to prevent the humans from escaping. They came to rely on human prisoners to fight and labor for the giantkings. The warmaker is now unsure of the bracelets new purpose. Near the end of the war, humans revealed a new weapon, forged of science, smashing through troops and encasing the survivors in stone. In desperation, the giantkings created the ritual that summoned the Sandstorm, which scorched and destroyed everything in its path. This is why most of the exiled lands are now a desert like waste. Now all the giantkings are dead, except Warmaker Klael. After thousands of years, Conan comes to speak with the Warmaker and goes to search for the Serpent Ring of Set.

Voice actors 
David  Sobolov - Arcos the Wanderer, Warmaker Klael
Robin Atkin Downes - Mek-kamoses, The Archivist
Neil Kaplan - Nunu the Cannibal
Benjamin Diskin - Gilzan the Treasure Hunter
Bill Millsap - Petruso the Sandstorm Maniac
Matthew Waterson - Conan the Barbarian
Dawn-Lyen Gardner - Jamila the Pirate Queen
Karen Strassman - Muriela the Artisan
Fryda Wolff - Razma of Shem

Reception 

In the first week of Conan Exiless early access release on Steam, it sold over 320,000 copies. Within the first 28 days, it had sold over 480,000 net copies (after returns and chargebacks), which was 7,000 short of the amount Funcom had projected to sell in the first year. As of July 2018, the game has sold 1.4 million copies, making it the biggest and fastest selling game in Funcom's history.

Conan Exiles received "mixed or average" reviews on all platforms, according to review aggregator Metacritic.

Notes

References

External links
 

2018 video games
Action-adventure games
Early access video games
Funcom games
Multiplayer and single-player video games
Open-world video games
PlayStation 4 games
Survival video games
Unreal Engine games
Video games based on Conan the Barbarian
Video games developed in Norway
Video games with Steam Workshop support
Video games with customizable avatars
Windows games
Xbox One X enhanced games
Xbox One games